Jehad Al Hussain (born July 30, 1982 in Homs, Syria) is a former Syrian footballer who played as a midfielder.

Club career

Al-Karamah SC

Al-Hussain was part of the youth academy of Al-Karamah SC which won the Syrian Under 18 premiere league and later on the Syrian Premier League three consecutive times and reached the AFC Champions League final in 2006.

In 2006, he was loaned to Al-Kuwait.

Kuwait SC

He has joined Kuwait SC in Summer 2008 and he won the 2009 AFC Cup playing against his old team Al-Karamah SC in the final, sharing the top scorer with 8 goals.

Qadsia SC

On 24 August 2009, Al Hussain moved to Al-Qadsia in the Kuwaiti Premier League and signed a two-year contract playing alongside his Al-Karamah teammate Firas Al-Khatib both as a duet .

Najran SC

In September 2011, Al Hussain moved to Najran SC in Saudi Professional League, his debut season in Saudi Professional League was very successful with 9 goals he helped Najran to stay away from relegation, in the second season alongside his national teammate Wael Ayan Najran reached the semi finals of the Gulf Club Champions Cup 2012–13, both players left Najran SC after months of unpaid Salaries.

Dubai CSC

In September 2013, he signed for Dubai CSC in the UAE First Division League. He scored 3 goals in one season.

Al-Taawon FC

In July 2014, he returned to Saudi Professional League with Al-Taawon FC marking himself  as The Most Assisting Player in two consecutive seasons 2014–15, 2015–16 and a third time 2017–18.

Al-Raed FC

Al-Hussain played for Al-Raed before announcing his retirement on 24 October 2020.

International career

Al Hussain has played his international debut for Syria managed by Jalal Talebi in 2002. the last was with Valeriu Tiţa's 23-man final squad for the AFC Asian Cup 2011 in Qatar.

Career statistics

Goals for senior national team
Scores and results table. Syria's goal tally first:

Honour and titles

Club
Al-Karamah
Syrian Premier League (3 titles): 2006, 2007, 2008
Syrian Cup (2 titles): 2007, 2008,
Syrian Super Cup (1 title): 2008
AFC Champions League: 2006 Runner-up

Al-Kuwait
Kuwait Emir Cup (1 title): 2009
AFC Cup: 2009

Al-Qadsia
Kuwaiti Premier League (2 titles): 2010, 2011
Kuwait Emir Cup (1 title): 2010
Kuwait Super Cup (1 title): 2009
AFC Cup: 2010 Runner-up

Al-Taawoun FC
 Kings Cup: 2019

National Team
West Asian Games 2005: Runner-up
Nehru Cup:
Runner-up (2): 2007, 2009

Individual
 2009 AFC Cup top scorer.
 Saudi Professional League :  2014–15 Best Playmaker (9 Assists) 
 Saudi Professional League :  2015–16 Best Playmaker (10 Assists) 
 Saudi Professional League :  2017–18 Best Playmaker (9 Assists)

References

External links
 
 
 

1982 births
Living people
Sportspeople from Homs
Association football midfielders
Syrian footballers
Syria international footballers
Syrian expatriate footballers
Expatriate footballers in Kuwait
Syrian expatriate sportspeople in Kuwait
Expatriate footballers in Saudi Arabia
Syrian expatriate sportspeople in Saudi Arabia
Al-Karamah players
Kuwait SC players
Qadsia SC players
Najran SC players
Dubai CSC players
Al-Taawoun FC players
Al-Raed FC players
2011 AFC Asian Cup players
Footballers at the 2006 Asian Games
Saudi Professional League players
UAE Pro League players
Asian Games competitors for Syria
Syrian Premier League players
Kuwait Premier League players